Richard Campbell Strohman (May 5, 1927 – July 4, 2009) was an American cell biologist who taught at the University of California, Berkeley. He is known for his criticisms of genetic determinism and for his research on skeletal muscle development. His research on human muscle contributed to the scientific understanding of muscular dystrophy, and he served as the research director for the Muscular Dystrophy Association in 1990. While teaching at Berkeley, he supported the Free Speech Movement, and was a member of both the anti-Vietnam War Faculty Peace Committee and of the pro-nuclear disarmament Faculty for Social Responsibility. He was the director of the Health and Medical Sciences Program at Berkeley from 1976 to 1979. He retired from Berkeley's faculty in 1991, but still remained active in teaching classes there. He was a member of the American Society of Cell Biology and the Society for Developmental Biology, as well as a fellow of the American Association for the Advancement of Science.

References

External links
Memorial page at the University of California Senate website
Faculty profile

1927 births
2009 deaths
Deaths from Alzheimer's disease
Deaths from dementia in California
University of California, Berkeley faculty
Columbia University alumni
American molecular biologists
Cell biologists
People from Brooklyn
Fellows of the American Association for the Advancement of Science
Anti–Vietnam War activists
Free speech activists
20th-century American biologists
Scientists from New York (state)